Košarkaški klub Vrijednosnice Osijek, commonly referred to as KK Vrijednosnice Osijek, is a men's professional basketball club based in Osijek, Croatia. They are currently competing in the HT Premijer liga. 

Founded in the village of Darda as KK Darda in 1980, club was relocated to Osijek in the summer of 2014. The club's second team remained in Darda and competes in Croatian second basketball league under the name KK Vrijednosnice Osijek Darda.

Name changes
OKK Darda: 1980–1991
Inactive due to the Croatian War of Independence: 1991–1998
ŠKK Darda: 1998–2004
KK Darda: 2004–2006
KK Vrijednosnice Osijek Darda: 2006–2014
KK Vrijednosnice Osijek: 2014–present

Players

Current roster

Head coaches 

  Renato Martinko  
  Damir Voloder 
  Dejan Srzić 
  Senad Muminović 
  Vladimir Krstić 
  Domagoj Kujundžić 
  Stipe Šarlija 
  Marko Mandić

References

External links

 at eurobasket.com

KK Vrijednosnice Osijek
Basketball teams in Croatia
Basketball teams established in 1980
Basketball teams in Yugoslavia